Axel Journiaux (born 20 May 1995 in Saint-Malo) is a French former professional cyclist, who rode professionally for  in 2018 and 2019.

Major results
2017
 1st Stage 1 Grand Prix Priessnitz spa
 3rd Overall Tour du Maroc

References

External links

1995 births
Living people
French male cyclists
Sportspeople from Saint-Malo
Cyclists from Brittany